Clube Atlético Itapemirim, commonly known as Atlético Itapemirim, is a Brazilian football club based in Itapemirim, Espírito Santo state.

Atlético Itapemirim is currently ranked seventh among Espírito Santo teams in CBF's national club ranking, at 197th place overall.

Stadium
Rondoniense play their home games at Estádio José Olívio Soares. The stadium has a maximum capacity of 2,000 people.

Honours
 Campeonato Capixaba
 Winners (1): 2017

 Copa Espírito Santo
 Winners (1): 2017

References

External links
 Atlético Itapemirim on OGol

Association football clubs established in 1965
Atlético Itapemirim
1965 establishments in Brazil